The following is a list of awards and nominations received by American actor Jack Nicholson.

Nicholson is one of only six performers to have won three Academy Awards in the acting categories, and is the most nominated male performer in the acting categories, with a total of 12 nominations. His other major competitive awards include a Grammy Award, three BAFTA Awards, and six Golden Globes. He was also the recipient of the Cecil B DeMille Award at the 1999 Golden Globe ceremony.

Major associations

Academy Awards 
The Oscars (officially called "Academy Awards") are a set of awards given annually for excellence of cinematic achievements. The awards, organized by the Academy of Motion Picture Arts and Sciences (AMPAS), were first held in 1929 at the Hollywood Roosevelt Hotel. Nicholson has received three awards from twelve nominations, the most nominations for a male performer and tied with Daniel Day-Lewis and Walter Brennan for most wins by a male performer.

British Academy Film Awards
The BAFTA Award is an annual award show presented by the British Academy of Film and Television Arts. The awards were founded in 1947 as The British Film Academy, by David Lean, Alexander Korda, Carol Reed, Charles Laughton, Roger Manvell, and others. Nicholson has received three awards from seven nominations.

Golden Globe Awards
The Golden Globe Award is an accolade bestowed by the 93 members of the Hollywood Foreign Press Association (HFPA) recognizing excellence in film and television, both domestic and foreign. Nicholson has received six competitive awards from seventeen nominations. In addition, he received the Cecil B. DeMille Award in 1999.

Grammy Awards
The Grammy Awards are awarded annually by the National Academy of Recording Arts and Sciences of the United States for outstanding achievements in the music industry. Often considered the highest music honor, the awards were established in 1958. Nicholson has been awarded once.

Screen Actors Guild Awards

Cannes Film Festival

Industry awards

MTV Movie & TV Awards

National Board of Review
The National Board of Review was founded in 1909 in New York City to award "film, domestic and foreign, as both art and entertainment". Nicholson has received six awards.

Satellite Awards
The Satellite Awards are a set of annual awards given by the International Press Academy. Nicholson has received two awards from five nominations.

Saturn Awards

Film critic awards

Miscellaneous awards

Others

Notes

References

Nicholson, Jack
de:Liste von Auszeichnungen Jack Nicholsons